Bradon Cache Godfrey (born October 17, 1985 in Layton, Utah) is a former American football wide receiver. He was signed by the Atlanta Falcons as an undrafted free agent in 2009. He played college football at Utah.

Godfrey has also been a member of the Baltimore Ravens.

College career
Godfrey finished his college career with 128 receptions for 1,440 yards and eight touchdowns in 36 career games.

Professional career

Atlanta Falcons
After going undrafted in the 2009 NFL Draft, Godfrey was signed by the Atlanta Falcons as an undrafted free agent. He was waived on August 6 to make room for veteran wide receiver Marty Booker.

Baltimore Ravens
Godfrey was signed by the Baltimore Ravens on August 15, 2009. He was waived on August 31.

References

External links
Utah Utes bio

1985 births
Living people
People from Layton, Utah
Players of American football from Utah
American football wide receivers
Utah Utes football players
Atlanta Falcons players
Baltimore Ravens players